WSMV may refer to:

 WSMV-TV, a television station based in Nashville, Tennessee
 Wheat streak mosaic virus, a virus causing wheat streak mosaic